A universal testing machine (UTM), also known as a universal tester, materials testing machine or materials test frame, is used to test the tensile strength and compressive strength of materials. An earlier name for a tensile testing machine is a tensometer.  The "universal" part of the name reflects that it can perform many standard tensile and compression tests on materials, components, and structures (in other words, that it is versatile).

Components
Several variations are in use.  Common components include:

 Load frame - Usually consisting of two strong supports for the machine.  Some small machines have a single support.
 Load cell - A force transducer or other means of measuring the load is required.  Periodic calibration is usually required by governing regulations or quality system.
 Cross head - A movable cross head (crosshead) is controlled to move up or down.  Usually this is at a constant speed: sometimes called a constant rate of extension (CRE) machine.  Some machines can program the crosshead speed or conduct cyclical testing, testing at constant force, testing at constant deformation, etc. Electromechanical, servo-hydraulic, linear drive, and resonance drive are used.
 Means of measuring extension or  deformation - Many tests require a measure of the response of the test specimen to the movement of the cross head.  Extensometers are sometimes used.
 Output device - A means of providing the test result is needed.  Some older machines have dial or digital displays and  chart recorders.  Many newer machines have a computer interface for analysis and printing.
 Conditioning - Many tests require controlled conditioning (temperature, humidity, pressure, etc.).  The machine can be in a controlled room or a special environmental chamber can be placed around the test specimen for the test.
 Test fixtures, specimen holding jaws, and related sample making equipment are called for in many test methods.

Use

The set-up and usage are detailed in a test method, often published by a standards organization.  This specifies the sample preparation, fixturing, gauge length (the length which is under study or observation), analysis,  etc. 

The specimen is placed in the machine between the grips and an extensometer if required can automatically record the change in gauge length during the test. If an extensometer is not fitted, the machine itself can record the displacement between its cross heads on which the specimen is held.  However, this method not only records the change in length of the specimen but also all other extending / elastic components of the testing machine and its drive systems including any slipping of the specimen in the grips.
 
Once the machine is started it begins to apply an increasing load on specimen. Throughout the tests the control system and its associated software record the load and extension or compression of the specimen. 

Machines range from very small table top systems  to ones with over 53 MN (12 million lbf) capacity.

See also
 Modulus of elasticity
 Stress-strain curve
 Young's modulus
 Necking (engineering)
 Fatigue testing
 Hydraulic press

References

 ASTM E74 - Practice for Calibration of Force Measuring Instruments for Verifying the Force Indication of Testing Machines
 ASTM E83 - Practice for Verification and Classification on Extensometer Systems
 ASTM E1012 - Practice for Verification of Test Frame and Specimen Alignment Under Tensile and Compressive Axial Force Application
 ASTM E1856 - Standard Guide for Evaluating Computerized Data Acquisition Systems Used to Acquire Data from Universal Testing Machines
 JIS K7171   - Standard for determine the flextural strength for plastic material & products

External links

 Video of a universal testing machine performing a tensile test
 What is a Universal Test Machine?

Materials science
Tests
Measuring instruments